A bayonet is a blade fastened to the end of a gun or rifle.

Bayonet may also refer to:

Military
 HMAS Bayonet (P 101), an Australian naval patrol boat
 Operation Wrath of God or Operation Bayonet, a covert operation directed by Israel's Mossad

Other uses
 Bayonet Constitution, a nickname for the 1887 Constitution of the Kingdom of Hawaii
 Bayonet lug, a metal feature used to attach a bayonet to a long gun
 Bayonet mount, an electrical fastening mechanism
 Lens mount, sometimes as a bayonet type
 Spanish bayonet (disambiguation), any of several plants in the genus Yucca or Hesperoyucca
 Operation Bayonet (darknet), multinational law enforcement operation targeting darknet
 Bayonet (1936 film), a 1936 Italian film
 Bayonet (2018 film), 2018 Finnish-Mexican film
 Bayonet (band), an American hardcore punk band

See also
 Bayonetta, a video game series